John Landers may refer to:

 John Landers (baseball) (1892–1975), American baseball player
 John D. Landers, a colonel in the United States Army Air Forces
 John Joe Landers, an Irish Gaelic footballer
 John Maxwell Landers,  a British historian, anthropologist, and academic
 John Landers Stevens (1877–1940), American actor